David Goldsmith (born July 19, 1969 in New Brunswick, New Jersey) is an American actor. 
He featured in the Melrose Place spin-off Models Inc. where he played  actress Teresa Hill's boyfriend and would-be manager. He later appeared in Hop, Rush Hour 3 and Beverly Hills Chihuahua.

He also wrote and directed Sally, a 2000 film starring Rachael Leigh Cook.

References

External links
 

Living people
1969 births
American male actors
Jewish American male actors
21st-century American Jews